Wien Simmering (German for Vienna Simmering) is a railway station located in the Simmering district of Vienna, Austria.  Opened in 1976, it is owned and operated by the Austrian Federal Railways (ÖBB), and is served by international, regional and S-Bahn trains.

Services 
 the following services stop at Wien Simmering:

 REX: hourly service between Wien Hauptbahnhof and Bratislava.

References

Further reading

External links 
 
 

Simmering
Buildings and structures in Simmering (Vienna)
Railway stations opened in 1976